A water gap is a gap that flowing water has carved through a mountain range or mountain ridge and that still carries water today. Such gaps that no longer carry water currents are called wind gaps. Water gaps and wind gaps often offer a practical route for road and rail transport to cross the mountain barrier.

Geology 

A water gap is usually an indication of a river that is older than the current topography. The likely occurrence is that a river established its course when the landform was at a low elevation, or by a rift in a portion of the crust of the earth having a very low stream gradient and a thick layer of unconsolidated sediment.

In a hypothetical example, a river would have established its channel without regard for the deeper layers of rock. A later period of uplift would cause increased erosion along the riverbed, exposing the underlying rock layers. As the uplift continued, the river, being large enough, would continue to erode the rising land, cutting through ridges as they formed.

Water gaps are common in the Ridge-and-Valley Appalachians of eastern North America.

Alternatively, a water gap may be formed through headward erosion of two streams on opposite sides of a ridge, ultimately resulting in the capture of one stream by the other.

Notable examples

Chicago Portage, Illinois - Saddle Point runs through the city itself.
Columbia River Gorge, Oregon and Washington, and Wallula Gap, Washington, United States
Cumberland Narrows, Maryland, United States
Delaware Water Gap, New Jersey and Pennsylvania, United States
Heavitree Gap, Alice Springs, Australia
Iron Gates on the Danube River, forming the border between Serbia and Romania
Kali Gandaki Gorge - cuts through the world's tallest mountain range, the Himalayas in Nepal
Manawatu Gorge, New Zealand
Middle Rhine in Germany
Pongo de Mainique, Peru - on the Urubamba River
Pongo de Manseriche, Peru - on the Marañón River
Potomac Water Gap, United States
Weltenburg Narrows on the Danube River in Bavaria

See also
 Antecedent drainage stream
 Defile (geography)
 Narrows
 Peneplain

Structural geology
Erosion landforms
River morphology